Stara Lipa is a settlement on the road from Dragatuš to Vinica in White Carniola in southeastern Slovenia. It belongs to the Municipality of Črnomelj. The area is part of the traditional region of Lower Carniola and is now included in the Southeast Slovenia Statistical Region.

References

External links
Stara Lipa on Geopedia

Populated places in the Municipality of Črnomelj